Bobby Ray Duckworth (born November 27, 1958 in Crossett, Arkansas) is an American former professional football player who was a wide receiver in the National Football League (NFL) for the San Diego Chargers, Los Angeles Rams and Philadelphia Eagles.  He played college football at the Arkansas Razorbacks and was selected in the sixth round of the 1981 NFL Draft.

In his five seasons in the NFL, Duckworth caught 82 passes for 1,784 yards and 13 touchdowns.

In January 1992, Duckworth was sentenced to three years for the rape of a woman in his home in Carlsbad, California.

References

1958 births
Living people
American football wide receivers
Los Angeles Rams players
San Diego Chargers players
Philadelphia Eagles players
Arkansas Razorbacks football players
People from Crossett, Arkansas